The Markar Clock Tower also known as Borj-e Sa'at-e Markar  is the historical clock tower in Yazd, Iran.

History
The cost of building has been paid by a Zoroastrian from India, Pashutanji Marker. The clock tower has been made on 26 Oct 1942. The Markar clock tower or Borj-e Sa'at Markar is located in the middle of the Marker Clock Plaza. The Tower is located in the center point of Iran coordinately.

Architecture 
The tower has a height of about 4 meters, a square shape, a pyramid on, and looks like as an obelisk. The Tower is located in the center point of Iran coordinately. The movement system has been made in London by J. Smith & Sons Co. The spring should be charged weekly.

Mirza Soroush obtained permission for, and supervised the construction of the Markar Plaza with gardens around it. The plaza is situated on the road to Kerman just north of the Markarabad school entrance.

There are poems on four sides of tower from a local poet, Naser, which located in two lines and should read clockwise. The upper line poem is about Ferdowsi, but the lower line is about the benefactor. The last hemstitch (شادم از کردار نیک مارکار) implies the end time/year of building of tower in Abjad numerals system; 13:20 or 1320 (Solar Hijri), as well as Markar's religion (Zoroastrian) by using one of his religion maxims: "Good Deeds"; (Persian: کردار نیک).

This hemstitch has an Abjad numeric value: 300+1+4+40+1+7+20+200+4+1+200+50+10+20+40+1+200+20+1+200=1320

Etymology
Sa'at means "clock", which refers to the four face clock in top of the tower. Markar is the name of benefactor who paid the cost of building.

Gallery

References 

Buildings and structures in Yazd
Geographical centres